Nicole Paradis Grindle is an American film producer. Her producing credits include numerous animated films released by Pixar. She is best known for producing  Incredibles 2  (2018) and short animated film Sanjay's Super Team (2015), which received a nomination in the category of Best Animated Short Film at the 88th Academy Awards, and for Best Animated Short Subject at the 43rd Annie Awards. She is also an associate producer for Toy Story 3 (2010) and Monsters University (2013).

References

External links 
 

Living people
American animated film producers
American women animators
American film producers
American animators
Pixar people
Year of birth missing (living people)